James Joseph "Whitey" Bulger Jr. (September 3, 1929 – October 30, 2018) was an American organized crime boss who led the Winter Hill Gang in the Winter Hill neighborhood of Somerville, Massachusetts, a city directly northwest of Boston. On December 23, 1994, Bulger fled the Boston area and went into hiding after his former FBI handler, John Connolly, tipped him off about a pending RICO indictment against him. Bulger remained at large for sixteen years. After his 2011 arrest, federal prosecutors tried Bulger for nineteen murders based on grand jury testimony from Kevin Weeks and other former criminal associates.

Although Bulger adamantly denied it, the FBI revealed that he had served as an informant for several years starting in 1975. Bulger provided information about the inner workings of the Patriarca crime family, his Italian-American Mafia rivals based in Boston and Providence, Rhode Island. In return, Connolly, as Bulger's FBI handler, ensured that the Winter Hill Gang were effectively ignored. Beginning in 1997, press reports exposed various instances of criminal misconduct by federal, state, and local officials with ties to Bulger, causing embarrassment to several government agencies, especially to 
the FBI.

Bulger became a fugitive in 1994 and was added to the FBI's Ten Most Wanted Fugitives list in 1999, and was considered the most wanted person on the list behind Osama bin Laden. He was apprehended along with his longtime girlfriend, Catherine Greig, outside an apartment complex in Santa Monica, California, on June 22, 2011. By then he was 81 years old. Bulger and Greig were then extradited to Boston and taken to court under heavy guard. In June 2012, Greig pleaded guilty to conspiracy to harbor a fugitive, identity fraud, and conspiracy to commit identity fraud, receiving a sentence of eight years in prison. Bulger declined to seek bail and remained in custody.

Bulger's trial began in June 2013. He was tried on thirty-two counts of racketeering, money laundering, extortion and weapons charges, including complicity in nineteen murders. On August 12, Bulger was found guilty on 31 counts, including both racketeering charges, and was found to have been involved in eleven murders. On November 14, he was sentenced to two consecutive life sentences plus five years by U.S. District Court Judge Denise J. Casper. Bulger was incarcerated at the United States Penitentiary Coleman II in Sumterville, Florida.

Bulger was transferred to several facilities in October 2018; first to the Federal Transfer Center in Oklahoma and then to the United States Penitentiary, Hazelton, near Bruceton Mills, West Virginia. Bulger, who was in a wheelchair, was beaten to death by inmates on October 30, 2018, within hours of his arrival at Hazelton. In 2022, Fotios Geas, Paul DeCologero and Sean McKinnon were charged with conspiracy to commit first-degree murder in Bulger's death.

Early life
Whitey Bulger's father, James Joseph Bulger Sr., was from Harbour Grace, Newfoundland (now the Canadian province of Newfoundland and Labrador), hailing from Irish parents. After settling in Everett, Massachusetts, James Sr. married Jane Veronica "Jean" McCarthy, a first-generation Irish immigrant. Their first child, James Joseph Bulger Jr., was born in 1929. 

Bulger's father worked as a union laborer and occasional longshoreman; he lost his arm in an industrial accident and the family was reduced to poverty. In May 1938, the Mary Ellen McCormack Housing Project was opened in the neighborhood of South Boston. The Bulger family moved in and the children grew up there. The other Bulger children, William Bulger and John P. Bulger, excelled at school; James Bulger Jr. became drawn into street life.

Early in his criminal career, local police gave Bulger the nickname "Whitey" because of his blond hair. Bulger hated the name; he preferred to be called "Jim", "Jimmy", or even "Boots". The last nickname came from his habit of wearing cowboy boots, which he used to hide a switchblade. However, the nickname "Whitey" stuck.

Early criminal career
Bulger developed a reputation as a thief and street fighter fiercely loyal to South Boston. This led to him meeting more experienced criminals and finding more lucrative opportunities. In 1943, 14-year-old Bulger was arrested and charged with larceny. By then he had joined a street gang known as the "Shamrocks" and would eventually be arrested for assault, forgery and armed robbery. Bulger was sentenced to a juvenile reformatory for these offenses.

Shortly after his release in April 1948, Bulger joined the United States Air Force, but he had not reformed. He spent time in the military prison for several assaults and was later arrested by Air Force police in 1950 for going absent without leave. Nevertheless, he received an honorable discharge in 1952 and returned to Massachusetts.

Prison

In 1956, Bulger served his first term in federal prison at Atlanta Penitentiary for armed robbery and truck hijacking. He later told mobster Kevin Weeks that while there, he was used as a human subject in the CIA-sponsored MK-ULTRA program. Bulger later complained that the inmates had been "recruited by deception" and were told they were helping to find "a cure for schizophrenia", when in fact they were being used to research mind control. Evidence of the experiments were later confirmed as CIA documentation emerged. 

Bulger and eighteen other inmates, all of whom had volunteered in return for reduced sentences, were given LSD and other drugs over an eighteen-month period. He described his experience as "nightmarish" and said it took him "to the depths of insanity", writing in his notebooks that he heard voices and feared being "committed for life" if he admitted this to anyone.

In 1959, Bulger was briefly transferred to maximum security at Alcatraz Federal Penitentiary in California. Later in his sentence, he was transferred to Leavenworth Federal Penitentiary and, in 1963, to Lewisburg Federal Penitentiary. Bulger's third petition for parole, in 1965, was granted after he had served nine years in prison. He would not be arrested again for forty-six years.

Killeen–Mullen War
After his release, Bulger worked as a janitor and construction worker before becoming a bookmaker and loan shark under mobster Donald Killeen, whose gang, The Killeens, had dominated South Boston for over twenty years. The Killeens were led by three brothers—Donnie, Kenny and Eddie—along with Billy O'Sullivan and Jack Curran. Their base was the Transit Café in South Boston, which later became Whitey's Triple O's. 

In 1971, Killeen's younger brother Kenny allegedly shot and mauled Michael "Mickey" Dwyer, a member of the rival Mullen Gang, during a brawl at the Transit Café. A gang war resulted, leading to a string of killings throughout Boston and the surrounding suburbs. The Killeens quickly found themselves outgunned and outmaneuvered by the younger Mullens. It was during the war that Bulger set out to commit what Weeks describes as Bulger's first murder, of Mullen member Paul McGonagle. However, Bulger instead executed McGonagle's law-abiding brother Donald in a case of mistaken identity.

According to former Mullen boss Patrick "Pat" Nee, McGonagle ambushed and murdered O'Sullivan on the assumption he was the one responsible for his brother's killing. Bulger, realizing he was on the losing side, secretly approached Howie Winter, the leader of the Winter Hill Gang, and claimed he could end the war by murdering the Killeen leadership. Shortly thereafter, on May 13, 1972, Donald Killeen was gunned down outside his home in the suburb of Framingham. Nee disputes this, claiming that Killeen was murdered by Mullen enforcers James Mantville and Tommy King, not Bulger.

Bulger and the Killeens fled Boston, fearing they would be next. Nee arranged for the dispute to be mediated by Winter and Joseph Russo, caporegime of the Patriarca crime family in Rhode Island. In a sit-down at Chandler's nightclub in Boston's South End, the Mullens were represented by Nee and King, and the Killeens by Bulger. The two gangs joined forces, with Winter as overall boss. Soon after, Donald's sole surviving brother, Kenny, was jogging in Boston's City Point neighborhood when Bulger called him over to a car and said, "It's over. You're out of business. No more warnings." Kenny would later testify that Winter Hill enforcers Stephen Flemmi and John Martorano were in the car with Bulger.

Winter Hill Gang

After the 1972 truce, Bulger and the Mullens were in control of South Boston's criminal underworld. FBI Special Agent Dennis Condon noted in his log in September 1973 that Bulger and Nee had been heavily shaking down the neighborhood's bookmakers and loan sharks. Over the years that followed, Bulger began to remove opposition by persuading Winter to sanction the killings of those who "stepped out of line". In a 2004 interview, Winter recalled that the highly intelligent Bulger "could teach the devil tricks". During this era, Bulger's victims included Mullen veterans McGonagle, King, and James "Spike" O'Toole.

According to Weeks: "As a criminal, he made a point of only preying upon criminals... And when things couldn't be worked out to his satisfaction with these people, after all the other options had been explored, he wouldn't hesitate to use violence. ... Tommy King, in 1975, was one example. ... Tommy's problems began when he and Jimmy had worked in Triple O's. Tommy, who was a Mullins, made a fist. And Jimmy saw it. ... A week later, Tommy was dead. Tommy's second and last mistake had been getting into the car with Jimmy, Stevie, and Johnny Martorano. ... Later that same night, Jimmy killed Buddy Leonard and left him in Tommy's car on Pilsudski Way in the Old Colony projects to confuse the authorities."

In 1979, Winter was arrested, along with many members of his inner circle, on charges of fixing horse races. Bulger and Flemmi were left out of the indictments. They stepped into the power vacuum and took over the leadership of the Winter Hill Gang, transferring its headquarters to the Lancaster Street Garage in Boston's West End, near the Boston Garden.

Anti-busing attacks
In late August or early September 1974, Bulger and an accomplice reportedly set fire to an elementary school in Wellesley to intimidate U.S. District Court Judge Wendell Arthur Garrity Jr. over his mandated plan to desegregate schools in the city of Boston by means of busing. One year later, on September 8, 1975, Bulger and an unidentified person tossed a Molotov cocktail into the John F. Kennedy birthplace in Brookline in retaliation for Senator Ted Kennedy's vocal support for Boston school desegregation. Bulger then used black spray paint to scrawl "Bus Teddy" on the sidewalk outside of the national historic site.

FBI informant

In 1971, the Federal Bureau of Investigation (FBI) approached Bulger and attempted to recruit him as an informant as part of their effort against the Patriarca crime family. FBI Special Agent John Connolly was assigned to make the pitch. However, Connolly failed to win Bulger's trust. Three years later, Bulger partnered with Flemmi, an Italian-American mobster who had been an FBI informant since 1965. 

Although it is a documented fact that Bulger soon followed Flemmi's example, exactly how and why continues to be debated. Connolly frequently boasted to his fellow agents about how he had recruited Bulger at a late-night meeting at Wollaston Beach inside an FBI-issue car. Connolly allegedly said that the FBI could help in Bulger's feud with Patriarca underboss Gennaro Angiulo. After listening to the pitch, Bulger is said to have responded, "Alright, if they want to play checkers, we'll play chess. Fuck 'em."

Weeks considers it more likely that Flemmi had betrayed Bulger to the FBI, given the choice to supply information to the Bureau or return to prison. In 1997, shortly after The Boston Globe disclosed that Bulger and Flemmi had been informants, Weeks met with Connolly, who showed him a photocopy of Bulger's FBI informant file. In order to explain Bulger and Flemmi's status as informants, Connolly said, "The Mafia was going against Jimmy and Stevie, so Jimmy and Stevie went against them." In a 2011 interview, Flemmi recalled, "Me and Whitey gave [the Feds] shit, and they gave us gold."

According to Weeks: 

FBI Agent John Morris was put in charge of the Organized Crime Squad at the FBI's Boston field office in December 1977. Morris not only proved himself unable to rein in Connolly's protection of Bulger, but even began assisting him. By 1982, Morris was "thoroughly compromised", having had Bulger buy plane tickets for his then-girlfriend Debbie Noseworthy to visit him in Georgia while he was being trained for drug investigations. Even after 1983, when Morris was transferred to head up the Boston FBI's anti-drug task force, he remained an accomplice to Connolly and Bulger. 

In the summer of 1983, tensions between the Winter Hill Gang and the Patriarca family escalated to an all-time high. An employee for Coin-O-Matic, a cash laundering vending machine company owned by the Patriarcas, was kidnapped on the job. The Boston Police Department, operating on a tip, raided a butcher shop in South Boston co-owned by Bulger and two other Winter Hill members. Police officers found the employee hanging from a beef rack, having been severely tortured and held for more than six days. The victim never testified, and all law enforcement documents were redacted of his full name; law enforcement had hoped he would cooperate fully and then go into witness protection. People familiar with Coin-O-Matic knew exactly who the employee was, but the code of silence was still very strong in South Boston. In the next few months, three low-level Winter Hill Gang members were executed, mostly believed to be in retribution for the kidnapping. This bloody mob war shined a large spotlight on Morris and triggered an internal investigation within the FBI.

In 1988, Bulger's status as an FBI informant was revealed publicly when the Globes "Spotlight" team, led by journalist Gerard O'Neill, published a story detailing his work with the Bureau while still actively committing crimes. Rumors had abounded long before then, since it was unheard of for a criminal of Bulger's stature to go for years without even an arrest.

In 1995, Bulger and Flemmi were indicted on racketeering charges along with two Boston mafiosi, Frank Salemme and Bobby DeLuca. During the discovery phase, Salemme and DeLuca were listening to a tape from a roving bug, which is normally authorized when the FBI has no advance knowledge of where criminal activity will take place. They overheard two of the agents who were listening in on the bug mention that they should have told one of their informants to give "a list of questions" to the other wiseguys. When their lawyer, Tony Cardinale, learned about this, he realized that the FBI had lied about the basis for the bug in order to protect an informant. Suspecting that this was not the first time this had happened, Cardinale sought to force prosecutors to reveal the identities of any informants used in connection with the case. Federal judge Mark L. Wolf granted Cardinale's motion on May 22, 1997. On June 3, Paul E. Coffey, the head of the Organized Crime and Racketeering Section of the Department of Justice, gave a sworn statement admitting that Bulger had been an FBI informant. Coffey stated that since Bulger was accused of "leading a criminal enterprise" while working as an informant and was also now a fugitive, he had "forfeited any reasonable expectation" that his identity would be protected.

On September 5, 2006, federal judge Reginald C. Lindsay ruled that the mishandling of Bulger and Flemmi caused the 1984 murder of informant John McIntyre, awarding his family $3.1 million in damages. Lindsay stated the FBI failed to properly supervise Connolly and "stuck its head in the sand" regarding numerous allegations that Bulger and Flemmi were involved in drug trafficking, murder and other crimes for decades.

Criminal activities in South Boston

Consolidating power
In February 1979, federal prosecutors indicted numerous members of the Winter Hill Gang, including boss Howie Winter, for fixing horse races. Bulger and Flemmi were originally going to be part of this indictment, but Connolly and Morris were able to persuade prosecutor Jeremiah T. O'Sullivan to drop the charges against them at the last minute. Bulger and Flemmi were instead named as unindicted co-conspirators.

Bulger and Flemmi then took over the remnants of the Winter Hill Gang and used their status as informants to eliminate competition. The information they supplied to the FBI in subsequent years was responsible for the imprisonment of several of Bulger's associates whom Bulger viewed as threats; however, the main victim of their relationship with the federal government was the Patriarca family, which was based in Boston's North End and in Federal Hill, Providence, Rhode Island. After the 1986 RICO indictment of Angiulo and his associates, the Patriarca family's Boston operations were in a shambles. Bulger and Flemmi stepped into the ensuing vacuum to take control of organized crime in the Boston area.

The murder of Louis Litif
In 1980, Bulger was approached in Triple O's by Louis Litif, a Lebanese-American neighborhood bookmaker. Weeks, a bouncer at the bar, said, "He wasn't a big guy, maybe five seven and 185 pounds. Of Arab descent, he had a mustache like Saddam Hussein. ... That night, as always, he was talking in his obnoxious loud voice. Even when there were 400 people in the bar, you always knew Louie was there."

Litif had been stealing money from his partners in the bookmaking operation and using the money to traffic cocaine, and had not only refused to pay Bulger a cut of his drug profits but committed two murders without Bulger's permission. Litif told an outraged Bulger he was also going to kill his partner, "Joe the Barber", whom he accused of stealing from the bookmaking operation. Bulger refused to sanction this, but Litif vowed to proceed. Bulger replied, "You've stepped over the line. You're no longer just a bookmaker." Litif responded that, as Bulger was his friend, he had nothing to worry about. Bulger coldly responded, "We're not friends anymore, Louie."

At the time, Weeks was about to get married and, shortly before the wedding, informed Bulger that he was having difficulty finding a seat for Litif at the reception. "Don't worry about it", Bulger responded. "He probably won't show." "[Louie] had always been a major moneymaker for Jimmy. ... And now he wanted to kill a friend of Jimmy. There was no way that would be allowed. Shortly after that, a week or so before my wedding, Louie was found stuffed into a garbage bag in the trunk of his car, which had been dumped in the South End. He had been stabbed with an ice pick and shot. 'He was color coordinated,' Jimmy told me. 'He was wearing green underwear and was in a green garbage bag.'"

According to Weeks,Strangely enough, Jimmy, told me, 'Louie's last words to me were a lie.' Apparently, Louie had insisted that he'd come by himself and that nobody had driven him over. It was hard to figure out why Louie lied to Jimmy that night. If he'd told Jimmy that someone had driven him, he might have gotten a pass. But it wouldn't have lasted long, since Jimmy had no intention of letting Louie run wild.

Halloran and Donahue murders
In 1982, a South Boston cocaine dealer named Edward Brian Halloran, known on the streets as "Balloonhead", approached the FBI and stated that he had witnessed Bulger and Flemmi murdering Litif. Connolly kept Bulger and Flemmi closely briefed on what Halloran was saying, specifically his claims, false according to Weeks, to having participated in the Tulsa, Oklahoma murder of businessman Roger Wheeler. Connolly reported that Halloran was shopping this information to the FBI for a chance for him and his family to be placed in the Witness Protection Program. Soon after, on May 11, 1982, Bulger, Flemmi, and Weeks were tipped off that Halloran had returned to South Boston. After arriving at the scene, Weeks staked out the Anthony's Pier 4 restaurant, where Halloran was dining. Michael Donahue, a friend of Halloran's from Dorchester, incidentally ran into him at the restaurant. In a decision that would prove costly to him, Donahue offered Halloran a ride home.

As Donahue and Halloran drove out of the parking lot, Weeks signaled Bulger by stating, "The balloon is in the air" over a walkie-talkie. Bulger drove up with another man armed with a silenced MAC-10; Bulger himself carried a .30 Carbine. Bulger and the other gunman, both disguised, opened fire and sprayed Halloran and Donahue's car with bullets. Donahue was shot in the head and killed instantly. Halloran lived long enough to identify his attacker as Bulger associate James Flynn, who was later tried and acquitted. Flynn remained the prime suspect until 1999, when Weeks agreed to cooperate with investigators and identified Bulger as one of the shooters. Flemmi has identified the second shooter as Patrick Nee, who has denied the allegation and has yet to be charged.

Donahue was survived by his wife and three sons. His family, and Halloran's, eventually filed a civil lawsuit against the U.S. government after learning that Connolly had informed Bulger of Halloran's informant status. Both families were awarded several million dollars in damages. However, the verdict was overturned on appeal due to the late filing of the claims. Thomas Donahue, who was eight years old when his father was murdered, has become a spokesman for the families of those allegedly murdered by the Winter Hill Gang.

Peak years
Throughout the 1980s, Bulger, Flemmi, and Weeks operated rackets throughout eastern Massachusetts including loansharking, bookmaking, truck hijacking, arms trafficking, and extortion. State and federal agencies were repeatedly stymied in their attempts to build cases against Bulger and his inner circle. This was caused by several factors. Among them was the trio's fear of wiretaps and policy of never discussing their business over the telephone or in vehicles. Other reasons included South Boston's code of silence and corruption within the FBI, the Boston Police Department, and the Massachusetts State Police. Although Connolly was Bulger's most infamous source inside law enforcement, Weeks has stated that Massachusetts State Police Lt. Richard J. Schneiderhan, the crew's only source inside that agency, was valued more highly.

Extortion of drug dealers
During the mid-1980s, Bulger began to summon drug dealers from in and around Boston to his headquarters. Flanked by Weeks and Flemmi, Bulger would inform each dealer that he had been offered a substantial sum in return for that dealer's assassination. He would then demand a large cash payment as the price of not killing them. Eventually, however, the massive profits of drugs proved irresistible.

Most of South Boston's cocaine and marijuana trafficking was under the control of a crew led by mobster John Shea. According to Weeks, Bulger briefly considered killing Shea, but eventually decided to extort a weekly cut of his profits. Weeks also said that Bulger enforced strict rules over the dealers who operated on his territory, strictly forbidding the use of PCP and selling drugs to children, adding that those dealers who refused to play by his rules were violently driven out of his turf. In 1990, Shea and his associates were arrested at the end of an investigation by the DEA, the Boston Police, and the Massachusetts State Police. He quietly served a long prison sentence and refused to admit to having paid protection money to Bulger, Flemmi and Weeks. He repeatedly got in fights with other inmates who accused Bulger of being "a rat." This earned Shea a legendary reputation in South Boston.

It would not be until the 1999 cooperation of Weeks that Bulger, by then a fugitive, was conclusively linked to the drug trade by investigators. According to an interview conducted with Globe reporters Kevin Cullen and Shelley Murphy, Weeks "estimated that Whitey made about thirty million dollars... most of it from shaking down drug dealers to let them do business on his turf."

Arms trafficking
During the most violent period of The Troubles, sympathy for Irish nationalism and the Provisional Irish Republican Army (IRA) was very common in South Boston, as were efforts to raise money and smuggle weapons for the IRA's campaign against the British presence in Northern Ireland. From the start of his involvement with the FBI, Bulger "insisted ... that he would never give up the IRA". Bulger had previously donated to NORAID and shipped weapons—"guns and a block of C-4 plastic explosives"—in a van to the IRA in the early 1980s. Bulger was annoyed when he learned that the IRA members he supplied had burned the van that contained the weapons. After meeting with IRA Chief of Staff Joe Cahill, Bulger and Nee raised $1 million (equivalent to $ million in ) "by shaking down drug dealers in South Boston and Charlestown". This money was used to buy weapons for the IRA which would be shipped across the Atlantic Ocean in the trawler Valhalla. Bulger also personally donated some of his own weapons.

On September 13, 1984, Bulger, Weeks and Nee supervised the loading of Valhalla. The final cache included "91 rifles, 8 submachine guns, 13 shotguns, 51 handguns, 11 bullet-proof vests, 70,000 rounds of ammunition, plus an array of hand grenades and rocket heads". During the return voyage, the Irish Navy stopped Marita Ann and seized the hidden arsenal, arresting IRA members Martin Ferris, Mike Browne, and John Crawley. The operation had been compromised by IRA member Sean O'Callaghan, who was an informant for the Irish National Police. The seizure marked the complete end of any major attempt by the IRA to smuggle guns out of the United States, which ended three years earlier with the arrest of the primary IRA's gunrunner George Harrison by the FBI.

When Valhalla crew member John McIntyre was arrested "for trying to visit his estranged wife", he confessed his role in the weapons smuggling to the Boston Police. McIntyre implicated Bulger in the botched smuggling to FBI agent Roderick Kennedy, but Kennedy "insisted that [Bulger's handler] Connolly overheard him ... talking about someone on the Valhalla cooperating". Connolly confirmed Bulger's suspicions of McIntyre, leading Bulger and Flemmi to consider murdering McIntyre for his betrayal.

According to Weeks, when Bulger met with McIntyre in a South Boston house, he hoped to avoid murdering the informant and offered to send him to South America with money and the understanding that he was never to contact his family or friends again. After interrogating McIntyre over several hours, however, Bulger decided that he did not have the discipline to cut ties with everyone. He then killed McIntyre and went upstairs to take a nap while Weeks and Flemmi removed the corpse's teeth with a pair of pliers and buried it in the basement.

Massachusetts Lottery
In the summer of 1991, Bulger and Weeks, along with associates Patrick and Michael Linskey, came into possession of a winning Massachusetts Lottery ticket which had been bought at a store he owned. The four men shared a prize of around US$14 million. Bulger was widely thought to have obtained his share of the jackpot illegitimately.

Downfall

In April 1994, a joint task force of the DEA, the Boston Police, and the Massachusetts State Police launched a probe of Bulger's illegal gambling operations. The FBI, by this time considered compromised, was not informed. After a number of bookmakers agreed to testify to having paid protection money to Bulger, a federal case was built against him under the Racketeer Influenced and Corrupt Organizations Act (RICO).

According to Weeks:

Bulger had also set up safe deposit boxes containing cash, jewelry and passports in locations across North America and Europe, including Florida, Oklahoma, Montreal, Dublin, London, Birmingham and Venice. In December 1994, he was informed by Connolly that sealed indictments had come from the Department of Justice and that the FBI was set to make arrests during the Christmas season. In response, Bulger fled Boston on December 23, 1994, accompanied by his common-law wife Theresa Stanley.

Fugitive
After fleeing Boston, Bulger and Stanley spent four days over Christmas in Selden, New York, before spending New Year's Day in a hotel in New Orleans's French Quarter. On January 5, 1995, Bulger prepared to return to Boston, believing that it had been a false alarm. That night, however, Flemmi was arrested outside a Boston restaurant by the DEA. Boston police detective Michael Flemmi, Stephen's brother, informed Weeks of the arrest. Weeks immediately passed the information on to Bulger, who altered his plans.

Bulger and Stanley spent the next three weeks traveling to New York City, Los Angeles and San Francisco before Stanley decided that she wanted to return to her children. They traveled to Clearwater, Florida, where Bulger retrieved his "Tom Baxter" identification from a safety deposit box. He then drove to Boston and dropped off Stanley in a parking lot. Bulger met with Weeks at Malibu Beach in Dorchester, where Weeks brought Bulger's girlfriend, Catherine Greig. Bulger and Greig then went on the run together.

In his memoirs, Weeks describes a clandestine meeting with Bulger and Greig in Chicago. Bulger reminisced fondly about his time hiding out with a family in Louisiana. He told Weeks, who had replaced him as head of the Winter Hill Gang, "If anything comes down, put it on me." As they adjourned to a nearby Japanese restaurant, Bulger finally revealed how exhausted he was with life on the run. He told Weeks, "Every day out there is another day I beat them. Every good meal is a meal they can't take away from me."

In mid-November 1995, Weeks and Bulger met for the last time at the lion statues at the front of the New York Public Library Main Branch and adjourned for dinner at a nearby restaurant. According to Weeks:

On July 7, 1996, a federal grand jury in Boston returned a 29-count indictment against Bulger and four other leaders of the Winter Hill Gang and the Patriarca Family; Bulger was indicted on 13 counts of racketeering. On May 23, 2001, Bulger, along with Stephen and Michael Flemmi, were charged in a 48-count federal indictment with racketeering, murder, and other crimes.

On November 17, 1999, Weeks was arrested by a combined force of the DEA and the Massachusetts State Police. Although by this time he was aware of Bulger's FBI deal, he was determined to remain faithful to the neighborhood code of silence. However, while awaiting trial in Rhode Island's Wyatt federal prison, Weeks was approached by a fellow inmate, a "made man" in the Patriarca family, who told him, "Kid, what are you doing? Are you going to take it up the ass for these guys? Remember, you can't rat on a rat. Those guys have been giving up everyone for thirty years."

In the aftermath, Weeks decided to cut a deal with federal prosecutors and revealed where almost every penny was stashed and every body was buried. Writing in 2006, Weeks recalled:

Manhunt
The first confirmed sighting of Bulger before his capture was in London in 2002. A businessman watching Hannibal recognized a photograph of Bulger in a scene featuring the website of the FBI's most wanted fugitives. However, there were unconfirmed sightings elsewhere. At one point, FBI agents were sent to Uruguay to investigate a lead. Other agents were sent to stake out the 60th anniversary celebrations of the Battle of Normandy, as Bulger was reportedly an enthusiastic fan of military history. Later reports of a sighting in Italy in April 2007 proved false. Two people on video footage shot in Taormina, Sicily, formerly thought to be Bulger and Greig walking in the streets of the city center, were later identified as a tourist couple from Germany.

In 2010, the FBI turned its focus to Victoria, British Columbia, on Vancouver Island. In pursuit of Bulger, a known book lover, the FBI visited bookstores in the area, questioned employees and distributed wanted posters. Following his arrest, Bulger revealed that instead of being reclusive, he had in fact traveled frequently, with witnesses coming forward to say they had seen him on the Santa Monica Pier and elsewhere in southern California. A confirmed report by an off-duty Boston police officer after a San Diego screening of The Departed also led to a search in southern California that lasted "a few weeks".

Capture

After sixteen years at large and twelve years on the FBI Ten Most Wanted Fugitives list, Bulger was arrested in Santa Monica, California, on June 22, 2011. He was 81 years old at the time of the arrest.

Bulger was captured as a result of the work of the Bulger Fugitive Task Force, which consisted of FBI agents and a Deputy U.S. Marshal. According to retired FBI agent Scott Bakken, "Here you have somebody who is far more sophisticated than some 18-year-old who killed someone in a drive-by. To be a successful fugitive you have to cut all contacts from your previous life. He had the means and kept a low profile."

A reward of US$2 million had been offered for information leading to his capture. This amount was second only to Osama Bin Laden's capture reward on the FBI's Ten Most Wanted Fugitives list. Bulger had been featured on the television show America's Most Wanted sixteen times, first in 1995, and finally on October 2, 2010. According to authorities, the arrests were a "direct result" of the media campaign launched by the FBI in fourteen television markets across the country where Bulger and Greig reportedly had ties. The campaign focused on Greig, describing her as an animal lover who frequently went to beauty salons.

Authorities received a tip from a woman in Iceland that Bulger was living in an apartment near a beach in Santa Monica. The Boston Globe identified the tipster as Anna Björnsdóttir, a former model, actress, and Miss Iceland 1974, who lived in Bulger's neighborhood.
A day later, "using a ruse, agents and other task force members lured Mr. Bulger out of his apartment", "arrested him 'without incident', then went in the house and arrested Greig".
Bulger was charged with murder, "conspiracy to commit murder, extortion, narcotics distribution and money-laundering". Agents found "more than $800,000 in cash, 30 firearms, and fake IDs" at the apartment.  Carmen Ortiz, U.S. attorney for the District of Massachusetts, said "she believes the death penalty is not an option in the federal charges Bulger faces in her district, but that he could face the death penalty for two cases outside the district". In Oklahoma, where Bulger is alleged to have ordered the killing of businessman Roger Wheeler Sr., in 1981, Tulsa County District Attorney Tim Harris said, "It is our intention to bring Bulger to justice and to be held accountable for the murder of Mr. Wheeler". In Florida, Miami-Dade State Attorney Katherine Fernandez Rundle said, "After a 16-year delay, I will be working to ensure that a Miami jury has the opportunity to look [Bulger] in the eyes and determine his fate".

Immediately after being brought back to Boston, Bulger began talking to authorities. He said that during his days as a fugitive he often went back and forth across the border to Mexico to buy medicine for his heart disease. Many anticipated, and some feared, that Bulger, in exchange for favorable treatment in sentencing, would have much to tell authorities about corruption at the local, state and federal levels, which allowed him to operate his criminal enterprise for so long.

Bulger was arraigned in federal court on July 6, 2011. He pleaded not guilty to 48 charges, including 19 counts of murder, extortion, money laundering, obstruction of justice, perjury, narcotics distribution and weapons violations.

In a 2011 interview, Kevin Weeks expressed surprise at Bulger's decision to cooperate after his arrest. Weeks said, "I don't understand because he's not the same as I remember him. I can't believe he's so chatty right now. So I don't know what he's doing". Weeks added that he is not afraid of Bulger, and that the residents of Boston should not be either: "I don't think he's Pablo Escobar where he can just walk out of his prison cell and come to South Boston or anywhere. No, no one's worried about him."

Catherine Greig

Bulger's companion during his years as a fugitive was his longtime girlfriend Catherine Greig (born April 3, 1951), who was nearly 22 years his junior. Greig grew up in Boston and had an identical twin sister, Margaret, and a younger brother, David. Their father was a machinist from Glasgow, Scotland, and their mother was from Canada, as was Bulger's father.

At about age 20, Greig married Robert "Bobby" McGonagle, a Boston firefighter. He was from a family that led the Mullen Gang and was injured during a mob gunfight in 1969. Before his 1987 death by drug overdose, McGonagle reportedly held Bulger responsible for the murders of his brothers, twins Donald and Paul McGonagle, who were killed in the fighting which occurred during the Mullen-Killeen gang war. The body of Paul McGonagle, of whom Greig's sister Margaret was a widow, lay hidden and buried for 25 years on Tenean Beach in Dorchester. Greig's younger brother David, a close associate of Bulger, was found shot dead on Cape Cod in an apparent suicide.

Greig met Bulger in her late 20s after she divorced Bobby McGonagle. She worked as a dental hygienist. Greig has been described as intelligent, hardworking and educated, although was very subservient to, and dominated by, Bulger. She and Bulger lived together for a time at her home in Squantum, a section of Quincy.

Greig had been wanted by the FBI since 1999. The criminal complaint against her alleges that she harbored a fugitive, Whitey Bulger. She was represented in the criminal proceedings by the prominent criminal attorney Kevin Reddington of Brockton, Massachusetts. After being captured alongside Bulger, Greig sought release on bail and home confinement, a request that was denied.

Greig initially indicated that she would go to trial rather than accept a plea bargain. In March 2012, however, Greig pleaded guilty to conspiracy to harbor a fugitive, identity fraud and conspiracy to commit identity fraud. On June 12, 2012, she was sentenced to eight years in federal prison. She declined to speak during her sentencing.

In September 2015, Greig was indicted on a charge of criminal contempt stemming from her refusal to testify before a grand jury about whether other people aided Bulger while he was a fugitive. In February 2016, Greig pleaded guilty to this charge. Greig's attorney recommended 12 months in prison, while prosecutors—citing Greig's "unrepentant ... obstruction"—asked for 37 months. In April 2016, U.S. District Judge F. Dennis Saylor IV sentenced Greig, then midway through her sentence for harboring Bulger, to 21 months on the contempt charge, pushing her release date to late 2020.

Greig served much of her eight-year sentence at the Federal Correctional Institution, Waseca in Minnesota, but was also detained at various points in Rhode Island ahead of proceedings in the criminal contempt case.

Greig completed her sentence on July 23, 2020, and was later released from home confinement and electronic monitoring. She has been living quietly in South Boston with her twin sister Margaret McCusker.

Final detention

According to an excerpt of a book on Bulger published by Boston magazine, Bulger only made one friend during his post-sentencing detention, Clement "Chip" Janis, a young convict who was trusted to run art classes for other convicts.

When Bulger arrived at the United States Penitentiary in Tucson there were other famous inmates there, including Brian David Mitchell, Steven Dale Green and Montoya Sánchez.

According to Janis, Bulger was attacked by a fellow convict nicknamed "Retro", whose knife pierced Bulger's neck and skull, and sent him to the prison infirmary for a month. Whether Bulger was targeted randomly or deliberately is not known. Apparently, the inmate was not motivated by any personal issues with Bulger, but commmitted the near-fatal assault so that he would be sent to solitary confinement, allegedly to avoid paying for drugs he had acquired from other prisoners.

Bulger was able to begin taking part in counseling with a prison psychologist at the Tucson facility. However, rumors circulated that the psychologist  was too sympathetic to Bulger, and may even have allowed him to use her cell phone. His counseling was soon terminated, and he was transferred to the Coleman Federal Correctional Complex in Florida.

At Coleman, Bulger started experiencing night terrors, which he attributed to the experiments he had taken part in while incarcerated in the 1950s, where he had been administered LSD. Bulger, who started his imprisonment with a rigorous exercise regime, was by this point using a wheelchair.

Racketeering trial and conviction

On June 12, 2013, Bulger went on trial in South Boston's John Joseph Moakley United States Courthouse before Judge Denise J. Casper on 32 counts of racketeering and firearms possession. The racketeering counts included allegations that Bulger was complicit in 19 murders. The trial lasted two months and included the testimony of 72 witnesses; the jury began deliberations August 6. On August 12, the jury convicted Bulger of 31 out of 32 counts in the indictment. As part of the racketeering charges, the jury convicted Bulger of the murders of 11 victims—Paul McGonagle, Edward Connors, Thomas King, Richard Castucci, Roger Wheeler, Brian Halloran, Michael Donahue, John Callahan, Arthur "Bucky" Barrett, John McIntyre, and Deborah Hussey. The jury acquitted Bulger of killing Michael Milano, Al Plummer, William O'Brien, James O'Toole, Al Notorangeli, James Sousa and Francis Leonard. They also reported themselves unable to agree about the murder of Debra Davis, though Bulger had already been found liable for her death in a civil suit. Following the verdict, Bulger's attorneys J. W. Carney Jr. and Hank Brennan vowed to appeal, citing Casper's ruling which prevented Bulger from claiming he had been given immunity.

On November 14, 2013, Bulger was sentenced to two terms of life imprisonment, plus five years. Casper told Bulger that such a sentence was necessary given his "unfathomable" crimes, some of which inflicted "agonizing" suffering on his victims. He was also ordered to forfeit $25.2 million and pay $19.5 million in restitution. Prosecutors in Florida and Oklahoma announced after Bulger's conviction that they would wait until after sentencing concluded before deciding whether or not to prosecute Bulger in their states. Bulger was indicted in Florida for the murder of Callahan and in Oklahoma for the murder of Roger Wheeler, and could have received the death penalty in those states.

In September 2014, Bulger entered the Coleman II United States Penitentiary in Sumterville, Florida. In October 2018, he was transferred to the Federal Transfer Center in Oklahoma City, and then a few days later to the Federal Penitentiary in West Virginia. According to prison documents obtained by The New York Times, Bulger gained a reputation for disconcerting behavior during his time in prison: "At the Coleman prison complex in Florida in September 2014, he was disciplined multiple times, including once for masturbating in front of a male staff member and once, in February, for threatening a female medical staff member". Bulger was also in poor health, as he was unable to walk and had a damaged hip, often falling out of bed. His health also declined due to a lack of exercise.

Death

Bulger was transferred from the Federal Transfer Center in Oklahoma City to United States Penitentiary, Hazelton, in West Virginia on October 29, 2018. At 8:20 a.m. on October 30, the 89-year-old Bulger was found dead. Bulger was in a wheelchair and had been beaten to death by multiple inmates armed with a sock-wrapped padlock and a shiv. His eyes had nearly been gouged out and his tongue almost cut off; a law enforcement official described Bulger as "unrecognizable". This was the third homicide at the prison in a 40-day span. Correctional officers had warned Congress just days before the most recent Hazelton death that facilities were being dangerously understaffed. Massachusetts-based mafia hitman Fotios "Freddy" Geas was the primary suspect in orchestrating the killing of Bulger. Geas, 51, and his brother were sentenced to life in prison in 2011 for their roles in several violent crimes, including the 2003 killing of Adolfo "Big Al" Bruno, a Genovese crime family capo who was shot in a Springfield, Massachusetts parking lot. According to ABC News, Bulger's medical status had been lowered on October 8, 2018, shortly before he was transferred.

On November 8, 2018, a funeral Mass was held for Bulger at Saint Monica – Saint Augustine Church in South Boston. Family members, including his brother, former Massachusetts state Senate president William M. Bulger, and the twin sister of Catherine Greig attended. Bulger's death came as a relief to many Bostonians, especially for family members of his victims; Steven Davis, whose sister Debra was reportedly killed by Bulger in 1981, stated that "[h]e died the way I hoped he always was going to die."

Bulger is buried at St. Joseph's Cemetery in the Boston neighborhood of West Roxbury under the Bulger family headstone inscribed with the names of his parents. In September 2019, the Bulger family filed a wrongful death lawsuit against the Justice Department, alleging that, by lowering Bulger's medical status and transferring him to Hazelton, he "was deliberately placed in harm's way. There is simply no other explanation for the transfer of someone in his condition and inmate status to be placed in the general population of one of the country's most violent federal penitentiaries." The Bulger family sought 200,000 in damages. In January 2022, U.S. District Judge John Preston Bailey dismissed the lawsuit, ruling federal law did not allow his family the right to sue Bureau of Prisons (BOP) officials because Congress expressly puts custody of inmates in the hands of the BOP, and "has repeatedly limited judicial authority to review BOP housing decisions and to entertain claims brought by prisoners."

On August 18, 2022, three men were indicted in connection with the beating death of Bulger: Fotios Geas, Paul J. DeCologero, and Sean McKinnon.

Family
Bulger had two younger brothers, William Michael "Billy" Bulger (born 1934) and John "Jackie" P. Bulger (born 1938). William Bulger served in the military during the Korean War but was never posted to Korea. He was formerly an influential leader of the Democratic Party in Massachusetts. In a long political career, William rose to become President of the Massachusetts Senate. After his retirement he was appointed President of the University of Massachusetts system.

In December 2002, William Bulger appeared before the House Committee on Oversight and Government Reform and refused to testify, citing his Fifth Amendment right against self-incrimination. In April 2003, the committee voted "to grant William Bulger immunity to obtain information concerning Whitey's whereabouts and the FBI's misuse of informants." In June 2003, William appeared before the committee, where he was grilled by legislators from both parties. He testified: "I do not know where my brother is. I do not know where he has been over the past eight years. I have not aided James Bulger in any way while he has been a fugitive." He added: "while I worried about my brother, I now recognize that I didn't fully grasp the dimensions of his life. Few people probably did. By definition, his was a secretive life. His actions were covert, hidden even from—or perhaps hidden especially from those who loved and cared about him. The subject that interests so many, the life and the activities of my brother James is painful and difficult for me." William said that the only contact with his brother during the fugitive years was a short telephone call in January 1995, shortly after his brother was indicted. Following this testimony, Massachusetts governor Mitt Romney waged an extended and ultimately successful effort to get William to resign from the presidency of the University of Massachusetts, which he finally did in August 2003.

John "Jackie" Bulger, a retired Massachusetts court clerk magistrate, was convicted in April 2003 of committing perjury in front of two grand juries regarding sworn statements he gave concerning contacts with his fugitive brother.

Personal life
Bulger fathered one child, Douglas Glenn Cyr (1967–1973), during a 12-year relationship with Lindsey Cyr, a waitress and former fashion model living in North Weymouth, Massachusetts. Bulger and Cyr began living together in 1966, when Cyr was 21 and a waitress at a North Quincy café. According to Cyr, "He used to say that there were four people he would turn up on a street corner for: Douglas, me, Billy, or his mother. And we all made him vulnerable." At six years of age, Douglas died from Reye syndrome after having a severe allergic reaction to an aspirin injection. Lindsey Cyr later recalled it as:

After Bulger's arrest, Cyr announced her support of him, stating:

After his split from Cyr, Bulger began a relationship with Theresa Stanley, a South Boston divorcée with several children. Bulger bought her an expensive house in suburban Quincy, Massachusetts, and acted as father to her children while commuting to "work" in South Boston. However, he was repeatedly unfaithful to her with a host of other women, and was often absent while overseeing the running of his organization. In a 2004 interview, Stanley stated that she was planning to publish her memoirs; however, she died of lung cancer in 2012 at the age of 71.

Press relations
According to Weeks:

Paul Corsetti
According to Weeks's memoirs, in 1980 Boston Herald reporter Paul Corsetti began researching an article about Louis Litif's murder and Bulger's suspected involvement. After reporting the story for several days, Corsetti was approached by a man who said, "I'm Jim Bulger and if you continue to write shit about me, I'm going to blow your fucking head off." Corsetti sought help from the Patriarca crime family, but they said that Bulger was outside their control. "The next day, Corsetti reported the meeting to the Boston police. He was issued a pistol permit within 24 hours. The cop who gave him the permit told him, 'I'm glad my last name is not Corsetti.' A couple days later Jimmy told me about the scene with the cop and was glad to hear how uncomfortable he had made Corsetti."

Howie Carr
In his memoirs, Kevin Weeks related his participation in an attempt to assassinate reporter Howie Carr at his house in suburban Acton. Weeks stated that Carr was targeted because he was "writing nasty stories about people, he was an oxygen thief who didn't deserve to breathe." Carr has been among the most aggressive critics of the Bulger brothers, Whitey and Billy, for their careers in the Boston area; among his works is the book The Brothers Bulger, detailing the Bulger brothers' 25-year period of controlling Boston politics and the Boston underworld.

Weeks stated that, although several plans were considered, all were abandoned because there was too much risk of injuring Carr's wife and children. The plans climaxed with Weeks' own attempt to shoot Carr with a sniper rifle as he came out of his house. However, when Carr came out the front door holding the hand of his young daughter, Weeks could not bring himself to shoot. He wanted another opportunity to "finish the job," but Bulger advised him to forget about Howie Carr. In his 2006 memoir Weeks said that, although he was aware of the public outcry that would have followed, he regretted not murdering Carr. "His murder would have been an attack on the system, like attacking freedom of the press, the fabric of the American way of life, and they would have spared no expense to solve the crime. But in the long run, Jimmy and I got sidetracked and the maggot lived. Still, I wish I'd killed him. No question about it."

Depictions in fiction and non-fiction

 The 2014 documentary film Whitey: United States of America v. James J. Bulger, made by Joe Berlinger, is based on Bulger's trials.
 The film Black Massreleased September 18, 2015, in the USstars Johnny Depp as Bulger and was directed by Scott Cooper. The film's screenplay, by Mark Mallouk and Jez Butterworth, is based on the 2001 non-fiction book Black Mass: The True Story of an Unholy Alliance Between the FBI and the Irish Mob, by Dick Lehr and Gerard O'Neill. The film chronicles Bulger's years as an FBI informant, and his manipulation of his FBI handler as a means to eradicate his rivals for control of the Boston underworld, the Italian Mafia.
 Bulger is mentioned considerably in the book All Souls: A Family Story from Southie by Michael Patrick MacDonald – a memoir about the author's life growing up in Boston during the 1970s and 1980s.

Characters based on Whitey Bulger
 The character of Frank Costello (played by Jack Nicholson) in the 2006 Martin Scorsese film The Departed is loosely based on Bulger, though the plot of the movie is adapted from the 2002 Hong Kong film Infernal Affairs.
 The 2006–2008 Showtime TV series Brotherhood, about two Irish-American brothers on opposite sides of the law, was inspired by the relationship between Whitey and Billy Bulger, although the show takes place not in Boston but in nearby Providence, Rhode Island.
 In the TV series Rizzoli & Isles, which premiered in 2010, the character of Paddy Doyle, an Irish-American mobster who is the biological father of lead character Maura Isles, is based on a romanticized vision of Bulger.
 In season 1 of the Showtime series Ray Donovan, the character of Patrick "Sully" Sullivan, played by James Woods, is loosely based on Bulger.
 The 2013 television drama The Blacklist starring James Spader about a career criminal who turns himself in to work with the FBI on his own terms was initially inspired by Bulger's arrest and trial.
 In season 2 of Power Book II: Ghost, the character of Dante "Mecca" Spears, played by Daniel Sunjata, is loosely based on Bulger.

See also
 William Bulger

Notes

References

 Street Soldier; My Life as an Enforcer for "Whitey" Bulger and the Boston Irish Mob by Edward MacKenzie and Phyllis Karas, Steerforth, 256 pp., 
 Rat Bastards: A Memoir of South Boston's Most Honorable Irish Mobster by John "Red" Shea
 Paddy Whacked; The Untold Story of the Irish-American Gangster by T. J. English, 2005.
 Hitman: The Untold Story of Johnny Martorano: Whitey Bulger's Enforcer and the Most Feared Gangster in the Underworld by Howie Carr (2011)
 "Notorious mob boss Whitey Bulger found dead in prison" from NBC News (October 30, 2018)

Further reading
 Betrayal: Whitey Bulger and the FBI Agent Who Fought to Bring Him Down by Robert Fitzpatrick and Jon Land; Forge Books, 2012.

External links

 
 Collected news and commentary at The Boston Globe
 
 Bulger Court Case Documents
 Court Ruling Denying Compensation to Victims Families
 Bulger's FBI Top 10 Most Wanted Fugitive Alert
 Whitey Bulger on crimelibrary.com
 "James 'Whitey' Bulger capture means on FBI's Most Wanted List, two down, eight to go" by Melissa Bell, Washingtonpost.com (June 23, 2011), retrieved June 26, 2018

1929 births
2018 deaths
2018 murders in the United States
20th-century American criminals
American male criminals
American murder victims
United States Air Force personnel of the Korean War
American crime bosses
American gangsters
American people convicted of assault
American people convicted of theft
American people convicted of murder
American people of Irish descent
American people who died in prison custody
Burials at St. Joseph Cemetery (West Roxbury, Massachusetts)
Deaths by beating in the United States
Federal Bureau of Investigation informants
FBI Ten Most Wanted Fugitives
Fugitives
Male murder victims
Military personnel from Massachusetts
Gangsters from Boston
Murdered American gangsters of Irish descent
People convicted of murder by the United States federal government
People extradited within the United States
People from South Boston
People murdered in West Virginia
Prisoners murdered in custody
Prisoners who died in United States federal government detention
United States Air Force airmen
Wheelchair users
Winter Hill Gang